is a Japanese football player. He is currently playing for Vanraure Hachinohe.

Club statistics
Updated to 20 February 2017.

References

External links

Profile at Vanraure Hachinohe

1993 births
Living people
Association football people from Osaka Prefecture
Japanese footballers
J2 League players
J3 League players
Japan Football League players
Kyoto Sanga FC players
Kataller Toyama players
AC Nagano Parceiro players
J.League U-22 Selection players
Vanraure Hachinohe players
Association football forwards